Aberdeen railway station is the main railway station in Aberdeen, Scotland. It is the busiest railway station in Scotland north of the major cities of Glasgow and Edinburgh. It is located on Guild Street in the city centre, next to Union Square.

The station is managed by ScotRail. Inter-city, regional, local and sleeper train services are provided to all parts of Great Britain by ScotRail, Caledonian Sleeper, CrossCountry and London North Eastern Railway. The station is the northern terminus of the Dundee–Aberdeen line and the southern terminus of the Aberdeen–Inverness line, and is measured  from Carlisle via Perth.

History

Pre-nationalisation
The station currently standing was built as Aberdeen Joint Station between 1913 and 1916, replacing an 1867 structure of the same name, on the same site. The station and the new Denburn Valley Line enabled the main line from the south and the commuter line from Deeside to connect with the line from the north. The lines from the south had previously terminated at the adjacent Aberdeen Guild Street. Even this had not been Aberdeen's first railway station, that distinction belonging to a previous terminus a short way south at Ferryhill. After the construction of the Joint Station, Guild Street Station became a goods station. Some of its tracks remain, but the vast majority of the site was cleared in 2005.

Prior to the construction of the Joint Station, lines from the north had terminated at Aberdeen Waterloo, a short but inconvenient distance along the edge of the harbour. This too became a goods station after the construction of the Joint Station. There is no longer a station at the site, but a goods service runs approximately weekly to industrial operations there. The Waterloo tracks join the north–south connecting Denburn Valley Line in the Kittybrewster area of the city, where the very first terminus of the lines from the north had briefly been, before extension and the building of the Waterloo Station. As far north as Inverurie, these follow the route of the Aberdeenshire Canal which had been purchased and filled in by the Great North of Scotland Railway.

Nationalisation and privatisation

As a result of the grouping of railway companies under the Railways Act 1921, Aberdeen was shared by the London and North Eastern Railway and the London Midland and Scottish Railway, each company running the station for a year and then handing its administration to the other company. At nationalisation in 1948, it then became part of British Rail. As part of the changes during this period which saw a general contraction of railway services in the UK, some services were cut in the 1960s. These included those running north to Peterhead and Ellon as well as the Deeside Line. Suburban services were heavily reduced and the grand suburban ticket office, located on the corner of Guild Street and Bridge Street, was closed. It now houses a hair and beauty salon. The number of platforms at the station were also reduced considerably in the early 1970s, from the thirteen of the late 1950s/early 1960s down to just seven by 1973. This rationalisation process saw the removal of all of the north end bay platforms to allow for redevelopment of that part of the site. However, significant improvements under British Rail included introduction of InterCity 125 high-speed service to London and other major destinations, and introduction of other new rolling stock. Other improvements included a new Travel Centre opened in 1978 and under British Rail's regional brand ScotRail, a major station renovation was completed in the 1980s. The station was also resignalled around this time, with two more bay platforms (1 & 2) taken out of use along with the former through platforms 8 & 9. This left just five platforms (3–7) in regular use – the layout that remains in operation to this day. The two former bay platforms remain in place and are used as sidings. The former double track through platforms 8 and 9 has since been singled, but the platform faces remain.

At privatisation in the mid-1990s, ownership of the station passed to Railtrack (along with all stations and other infrastructure in England, Wales and Scotland), while day-to-day management passed to the train-operating franchisee ScotRail, a division of National Express. Following the quasi-nationalisation of railway infrastructure in the early 2000s, the station is now owned by Network Rail. In 2004, the train-operating franchise and station management were taken over by First ScotRail. ScotRail continue to operate trains but the station and all signage is now branded with the  "ScotRail" logo, typeface and rolling-stock livery.

Motorail 
British Rail's Motorail service ran between London and Aberdeen from 1968 until Friday 26 May 1995.

Plans to reintroduce a Motorail service between London and Aberdeen operated by Motorail Ltd were announced December 1998 and confirmed in March 1999.

Listed building
Historic Environment Scotland designate the current building and road overbridge as Category A, noting that it was the last major station to be completed in Scotland in the period 1913 - 20.

Redevelopment as part of Union Square

The station had gradually become run-down in the last years of British Rail. In the late 2000s, the railway station and bus station were included in the extensive Union Square development, primarily sited on an abandoned railway goods yard east of the station. As part of this, the railway station was comprehensively refurbished. The original sandstone station building became the centrepiece of a covered plaza for the new shopping and entertainment complex, while a granite-faced building was constructed to house station offices, a new Travel Centre, and other facilities. The car park at the front of the station was replaced by a public square providing pedestrian access to the station and Union Square. In addition, direct access was provided from the station concourse to Union Square and through to the bus station, creating a completely covered transport interchange. The refurbished station opened in 2009 followed by Union Square itself some months later.

Recent developments 

Plans to relocate the ticket office and passenger waiting room, as well as upgrades to the taxi rank and concourse, were approved by Aberdeen City Council in December 2018, with work due to start in spring 2019. Under a separate scheme, the vacant Atholl House building to the north of the station is to be demolished, making way for the construction of a public square, hotel and student accommodation, and improved connections between the city's main Union Street and the station. This development could allow the currently disused platforms 8 and 9 to be brought back into service.

As of early 2019, the station's glass roof is undergoing replacement with polycarbonate panels as part of a £9 million upgrade. In June 2020, ScotRail announced that it would proceed with the modifications to the ticket office, waiting room, and taxi rank as soon as it was safe to do so following the coronavirus pandemic. There are no plans to reinstate the platforms yet.

These developments were expected to be completed by the end of 2021.

Facilities 

There is a staffed travel centre providing ticket office and information facilities (e.g. timetables), although it is not open in the late evening and closes before the last trains have departed. There are also automatic ticket machines outside this office and in the main concourse. Tickets purchased in advance (e.g. on the internet) can be collected from any of these machines. The entrance to the ScotRail first-class lounge is located inside the ticket office. Luggage trolleys are provided for travellers with baggage and a left-luggage facility is available with access from the front forecourt of the station.

A waiting room is available on the main concourse, as is a branch of WHSmith selling books, magazines, stationery and confectionery. There is also a pub and café. A wide range of other shopping and eating facilities are located in the Union Square complex which can be accessed directly through the concourse and is integrated with the station building. These include Boots, Costa Coffee, Starbucks, Marks & Spencer Simply Food and a range of other shops and restaurants. Unlike the travel centre, facilities at Union Square open late into the evening and also include ATM machines, through-access to the city's bus station, and a hotel operated by Jurys Inn. The original Station Hotel (now privately operated) as formerly operated by the Great North of Scotland Railway is open and located on Guild Street directly opposite the station.

There are toilet facilities accessible from the concourse, in addition to toilet facilities in the café (free to customers), on most trains (free to passengers) and in Union Square.

Medium-term parking is available in the adjoining College Street Car Park (with access only from College Street) and there are also a small number of free spaces which offer parking for 20 minutes only in a separate section of the car park inside the station itself. Taxis are available from a stand within the station concourse.

Passenger volume 

The statistics cover twelve month periods that start in April.

Services 
All scheduled services are operated by diesel-powered rolling stock. The services from Aberdeen for the May 2022 timetable are:

ScotRail

 1tph to Edinburgh Waverley via 
 1tph to  via , Perth and 
 1tp2h to  via  and 
2tph "Aberdeen Crossrail" services to Inverurie calling at all intermediate stations (introduced December 2019)
1tph "Aberdeen Crossrail" service from Inverurie to Montrose calling at all intermediate stations (introduced December 2019)

Caledonian Sleeper

CrossCountry
 1tpd to Plymouth, along the Cross Country Route
 1tpd to  via Dundee and Haymarket.

London North Eastern Railway

Connections

Buses 
Regional and national bus services (including buses to Aberdeen Airport) depart from Aberdeen bus station, which is located on the other side of the adjoining Union Square shopping and entertainment complex. It is possible to walk directly from the concourse, through Union Square and to the bus station without entering the open air. This option is useful in winter and in periods of bad weather.

Ferries
The ferries, operated by NorthLink Ferries, include a daily direct sailing to Lerwick, Shetland lasting around 12 hours overnight. On certain days of the week, the Lerwick ferry crossing includes a call at Kirkwall on Orkney, increasing the journey time by 2 hours.

See also 
Aberdeen Ferryhill TMD

References

Bibliography

External links

 Aberdeen Station Information

Railway stations in Aberdeen
Former Caledonian Railway stations
Former Great North of Scotland Railway stations
Railway stations in Great Britain opened in 1867
Railway stations served by ScotRail
Railway stations served by Caledonian Sleeper
Railway stations served by CrossCountry
Railway stations served by London North Eastern Railway
Railway stations serving harbours and ports in the United Kingdom
1867 establishments in Scotland
Category A listed buildings in Aberdeen
Listed railway stations in Scotland